Gajendra Singh Shekhawat (born 3 October 1967) is an Indian politician from Rajasthan who is currently serving as Union Cabinet Minister in Ministry of Jal Shakti. He is a member of parliament from the Bharatiya Janata Party (BJP) representing Jodhpur in the Lok Sabha.

Early life and education 
He was born in Jaisalmer in the Indian state of Rajasthan. His father, Shankar Singh Shekhawat, was a senior government officer in the public health department and travelled on frequent assignments across the state, so Shekhawat was educated at several different schools. He received a Master of Arts and master of philosophy from Jai Narain Vyas University, Jodhpur.

Political career
Shekhawat began his political career in student politics when in 1992 he was elected as president of the Student Union at JNVU University, gaining more votes than any other previous Akhil Bhartiya Vidhyarthi Parishad supporter. Shekhawat was appointed National General Secretary of the BJP Kisan Morcha, the farmers wing of the Bharatiya Janta Party. He was also a member of the Rajasthan State Executive of the Bharatiya Janata Party.

He was elected as a member of parliament to the 16th Lok Sabha in 2014, with the highest ever winning margin (4,10,051 votes) from the constituency of Jodhpur. One of his major achievements during his tenure as an MP has been the expansion of the Jodhpur Airport, a demand that had continuously been raised during the last 18 years.

Known for his use of social media, Shekhawat is the most followed Indian politician on Quora. His Quora profile has more than 73,380 followers and his answers on the social media platform have been viewed 6.5 million times. He also served as the Chairperson of the Fellowship Committee, member of the All India Council of Sports (AICS) and member of the Standing Committee on Finance.

Union Minister
On 3 September 2017 he was appointed Union Minister of State, Ministry of Agriculture and Farmers Welfare. He defeated Vaibhav Gehlot, the son of Ashok Gehlot, the Chief Minister of Rajasthan from Jodhpur by a margin of 2.74 lakh votes in 2019 Indian general elections. Shekhawat became the Minister of Jal Shakti on 31 May 2019. On 20 August 2020, Shekhawat tested positive for COVID-19.

Social works
Before entering electoral politics, Shekhawat held many positions in many forums and organisations; he was the co-convener of the Swadeshi Jagaran Manch, the economic wing of the Sangh Parivar and the General Secretary of Seema Jan Kalyan Samiti, an organisation dedicated to strengthening national security by developing border towns and villages.
. As General Secretary, he was instrumental in building a second line of defense that consisted of civilians residing near the border area of Rajasthan. He was also instrumental in furthering the impact of civil defence by setting up 40 schools and four hostels along the Indo-Pak border.

References

|-

|-

External links 
 

Living people
Narendra Modi ministry
India MPs 2014–2019
People from Jodhpur district
Lok Sabha members from Rajasthan
Bharatiya Janata Party politicians from Rajasthan
1967 births
People from Jaisalmer